The Blue Note is a music venue in Columbia, Missouri, and is a contributing property to the North Ninth Street Historic District. It was established in 1980 by Richard King and Phil Costello. It is famous for the legal case Bensusan Restaurant Corp. v. King over naming use on the internet.

The original Blue Note was located at 912 Business Loop 70 East and moved to its Ninth Street location (a restored vaudeville theater) in the early 1990s. In October 2014, the venue was sold to Matt Gerding and Scott Leslie.

Despite being a smaller venue, it has hosted numerous national musical acts, including Phish, Widespread Panic, R.E.M., Hüsker Dü (their last show), Uncle Tupelo, Meat Puppets, Chuck Berry, The Replacements, The Minutemen, Dinosaur Jr., Primus, Black Flag, Red Hot Chili Peppers, Violent Femmes, Soul Asylum, The Black Keys, Dave Matthews Band, Johnny Cash, Willie Nelson, Wilco and Arctic Monkeys, and holds a five-part concert series every summer called "Ninth Street Summerfest".

Rose Music Hall
Formerly Mojo's, Rose Music Hall is located down the street in the North Village Arts District and often referred to as "The Blue Note's little sister". The venue was also founded by King and is now owned by Gerding and Leslie, and is usually reserved for smaller-name bands, but has also booked several up and coming artists prior to their breaking out.

Past performers have included; Arcade Fire, Spoon, Ben Kweller, Secret Machines, Cold War Kids, White Rabbits, Tapes 'n Tapes, Carolina Chocolate Drops, Big Smith, Local Natives, Portugal. The Man and Cave.

Forrest Rose Park is located adjacent to Rose Music Hall and is maintained by Rose Music Hall's/Blue Note staff. The park began hosting outdoor performances in 2008.

See also
University of Missouri School of Music

References

Sources

External links

 Official site
 Mojo's official site

Music venues in Missouri
Theatres in Columbia, Missouri
Music venues in Columbia, Missouri
National Register of Historic Places in Columbia, Missouri
Buildings and structures in Columbia, Missouri
Tourist attractions in Columbia, Missouri
Event venues on the National Register of Historic Places in Missouri
National Register of Historic Places in Boone County, Missouri